Madame E. Guérin (born Anna Alix Boulle, 3 February 1878 – 16 April 1961) was born at Vallon (-Pont-d’Arc), Ardèche, France. She was the originator of the Remembrance Poppy Day. Prior to this, she was a teacher in Madagascar; a lecturer for the Alliance Française; and a lecturer, fundraiser and humanitarian in the United States, during World War I.  For services to France, she was awarded the Officier d'académie’ médaille and the Officier de l’Instruction Publique médaille. For her services to the United States, for the Liberty Bond, she was awarded the Victory Liberty Loan Medallion.

Initially, her Poppy Days benefited the widows and orphans of the war devastated regions of France.  She was christened “The Poppy Lady from France” after being invited to address the American Legion, at its 1920 convention, in Cleveland, Ohio, about her original ‘Inter-Allied Poppy Day’ idea.  Her idea was for all World War I Allied countries to use artificial poppies, made by French widows and orphans, as an emblem for remembering those who gave their lives during the World War I and, at the same time, creating a method of raising funds to support the families of the fallen and those who had survived, thereafter.  Now, the Remembrance Poppy encompasses all conflicts that have occurred since.

Early life 

Guérin was born Anna Alix Boulle on 3 February 1878 at Vallon (Vallon-Pont-d’Arc), France.  Her parents were farm-owner Auguste Boulle and his wife Anna (née Granier).  She married Cuban-born French national Paul Rabanit in Vallon, on 6 November 1897. Soon after the wedding, they travelled to the French colony of Madagascar.

Madagascar 

After arriving on the island of Madagascar, Anna (as Madame Rabanit) began teaching.  She created a boarding school ‘École Rabanit’, which gained a reputation as one of the best on the island.  She was one of the people, on the island, who helped Gouverneur Général Joseph-Simon Gallieni in his quest to educate the Malagasy people in the French language and culture. For these services, Anna was awarded the French médaille ‘Officier d'Académie’ (Silver Palms) in 1907. Also, in 1907, she divorced.  In 1909, she left Madagascar.  On 17 October 1910, Anna married Judge Constant Charles Eugène Guérin (“Eugène”) in Vallon.

Great Britain 

Anna, now Madame E. Guérin, went to Great Britain soon after marriage to Eugène.  She placed her two daughters in a London boarding school.  She lectured in England, Scotland and Northern Ireland for the ‘Alliance Française’ organisation for nearly four years.  She was passionate about promoting the French culture and language; and education.  Whilst in Great Britain, Anna was presented with le médaille Officier de l’Instruction Publique by Paul Cambon, the French Ambassador to London. On the whole, Anna lectured between autumn and spring, spending her summers in France.

World War I 

In 1914, before the outbreak of World War I, Anna Guérin had agreed to lecture in the United States. for three years; she kept to that arrangement and travelled across the Atlantic in October 1914. Initially, her lectures were under the auspices of the ‘Alliance Française’ but she would discreetly raise funds for French war causes, at the end of her lectures.  Those voluntary donations were sent direct to the American Red Cross.  Once the United States entered the war, Anna raised funds openly, on a public platform.  She raised funds for the ‘Food for France’ organisation; French widows and orphans; French veterans (medically discharged without a pension); the American Red Cross; the US Liberty Loan Bonds; etc.  Whilst lecturing for the US Liberty Bonds, Anna Guérin was described by many as the greatest of all war speakers.  Anna Guérin returned to France each summer. The influenza pandemic/Spanish 'Flu curtailed what was to be her 1918/19 tour.  She was halfway across the Atlantic Ocean when the 1918 Armistice was signed.

Inter-Allied Poppy Day 

Anna Guérin thought her fundraising days were over.  However, after five days back home in France, she was summoned to Paris. The French government created ‘La Ligue des enfants de France et d’Amérique’, with the poppy as its emblem. Madame Anna Guérin was tasked with returning to the United States to create the American branch – called the ‘American-Franco Children’s League’ (also known as ‘American Star’). The symbolism of the poppy was inspired by the poem In Flanders Fields by Lt. Col. John McCrae, a Canadian military surgeon.

In each state she visited, Anna Guérin set up American and French Children's League committees. Membership subscriptions and fundraising events would provide some valuable funds, much needed for orphans in the devastated war-torn regions of France, on a regular basis.  In 1919, she began holding Poppy Days in the United States – distributing artificial paper poppies, in exchange for donations.  Local women and girls were the mainstay of her operations; poppy sellers wore sashes bearing “In Flanders Fields the poppies grow”.  American Legion National Commander Colonel Frederick W. Galbraith Jr. invited Anna to explain her ‘Inter-Allied Poppy Day’ idea at the American Legion Convention in Cleveland, Ohio in September 1920. There, the Legionnaires christened Anna "The Poppy Lady from France"; adopted the poppy as their memorial emblem; and agreed to support her in her Poppy Days.  

In April 1921, every American State was informed that the French-made silk poppies (organised by “The Poppy Lady”) had arrived in the United States.  Also in that month, Anna Guérin’s American and French Children’s League had to undergo an enforced change. If the League was to continue functioning, it had to be recognised by the National Information Bureau in New York City. It was, to this end that, in October 1920, League President Hartley Burr Alexander, wrote to the Bureau’s Director.  The Bureau gave its approval but with certain caveats, one being that Anna’s American and French Children’s League should have a wider scope and be aligned to its Paris-based committee of La Ligue Americaine-Francaise des Enfants. 

On 27 April 1921, the wider scope was achieved by a merger with a newly formed charity, which had one Rt. Rev. Herbert Shipman as its helm, reverting to its original American-Franco Children’s League.  This merger caused upset.  Some old League members did not approve, they were not prepared to move to the new League.   These included the old League’s Chairman Mrs. Tyler Perine and its New York State Committee Chairman Mrs. Mercedes McAllister Smith. 

The new League took over the old League’s headquarters in New York but the break-away group continued its own poppy campaign, in competition with the new League, working out of Mrs. McAllister Smith’s New York home. Even the US President got caught up with the muddle and the National Information Bureau issued a statement saying that only the new League had been endorsed to sell poppies, no other.

It all resulted in Mrs. McAllister Smith bringing a $200,000 court case against the Right Rev. Herbert Shipman (Bishop Suffragan of the Diocese of New York); Maurice Leon (member of law firm Evarts, Choate, Sherman & Leon; writer; representative of the French Government during the War); George W. Burleigh (Judge Advocate-General of the New York National Guard); Bronson Batchelor (of Bronson Batchelor Inc., publicity agency); Roger B. Jenkins (officer of the Bronson Batchelor Inc. agency); Barry N. Smith (Head of the National Information Bureau); and Anna Guérin.  The case was eventually dismissed.

During the week before America’s Memorial Day (or Decoration Day), on 30 May 1921, Madame Anna Guérin and her ‘American-Franco Children’s League’ carried out the very first nation-wide Poppy Drive in the world: carrying out Poppy Days in every State.   Leading up to the Poppy Drive, articles appeared all over the country, appealing for “every man, woman and child” to wear a poppy.  In these Poppy Days, the charity was supported by the American Legion, and its Women’s Auxiliary; the ‘War Mothers of America’ (Service Star Mothers); Women’s clubs; and other organisations.

At the beginning of November 1921, Anna Guérin attended the next American Legion Convention, Kansas City, Missouri.  She had been personally invited but she also went to try and persuade the delegates from reneging on the poppy, as their memorial flower - in favour of the daisy. This was to no avail, the daisy was adopted and Daisy Days occurred. 

Although the American Legion’s Women’s Auxiliary kept the poppy as its memorial flower, by 23 January 1922, it decided not to continue giving support to Anna Guérin’s American and French Children’s League’s Poppy Days.  The Veterans of Foreign Wars filled the void the American Legion vacated.  As a consequence, in May 1922, it was the Veterans of Foreign Wars that became the first veteran organisation to carry out the very first nation-wide Poppy Drive in the United States.

In October 1922, the American Legion repudiated the daisy and again adopted the poppy.   For the 1923 US Poppy Days, both the Veterans of Foreign Wars and the American Legion purchased French-made poppies from Madame Guérin.   For the 1924 US Poppy Days, the Veterans of Foreign Wars had patented its own “Buddy” poppy, made by veterans.  The American Legion’s veterans could not make enough poppies but its Women’s Auxiliary helped out.

CANADA was next for Madame Anna Guérin.  On 4 July 1921, she spoke about her ‘Inter-Allied Poppy Day’ idea to men of the Canadian Great War Veterans’ Association (G.W.V.A.) in Port Arthur, Ontario (now Thunder Bay).  On 6 July, the Canadian veterans adopted it. The Canadians were the first of the British Empire veterans to do so.  In 1922, the bulk of poppies were made by Canadian disabled veterans. Anna handed the poppy mantle over to Captain James Learmonth Melville, M.C., who was Principal of the Vocational School for Disabled Soldiers. In 1923, Lillian Bilsky Freiman’s ‘Vetcraft’ disabled veterans took over the manufacture of Canadian Remembrance Poppies. 

NEWFOUNDLAND was a Dominion of the British Empire and not part of Canada at the time.  Although Newfoundland and Canada were intrinsically linked by their geographical positions, Newfoundland did not become part of Canada until 1949.  How it came to adopt Madame Anna Guérin’s ‘Inter-Allied Poppy Day’ is not known but it did.  There were Great War Veterans’ Association veterans in Newfoundland as well as in Canada so, perhaps, that was how.  The Ladies Auxiliary of the G.W.V.A., made all the preparations, in conjunction with the National War Memorial Committee.  By 21 October 1921, 12,000 poppies had already been ordered by the Newfoundland G.W.V.A.   Newfoundland’s first Poppy Day was held on 11 November 1921, Armistice Day.  Another memorial flower, the Forget-Me-Not, is held dear in Newfoundland.  They serve to commemorate those of the Royal Newfoundland Regiment who lost their lives on 1 July 1916 at Beaumont-Hamel, on the Somme.
  
GREAT BRITAIN was the next to receive Madame Anna Guérin’s attention. Anna Guérin landed at the Port of Liverpool, at 7.30 a.m., on 30 August 1921. She took examples of her French-made poppies to the British Legion men and explained her ‘Inter-Allied Poppy Day’ idea. The Legion was very sceptical and Anna Guérin’s credentials had to be checked out but, before September was out, the British had adopted the ‘Inter-Allied Poppy Day’ idea.  Because it was a very poor organisation, Madame Guérin paid for the British remembrance poppies herself and the British Legion reimbursed her, after the first British Poppy Day on 11 November 1921.  Anna Guérin was very rarely credited in the British newspapers and “widows and children of French soldiers” were sometimes mentioned but often the poppy makers were referred to as “peasants”.  From 1922 onwards, British veterans made Remembrance Poppies at The Poppy Factory and, from 1926, at Lady Haig's Poppy Factory.  

AUSTRALIA was very faithful to Anna Guérin, continuing to be loyal to French-made poppies until 1926, inclusive.  The country's veterans had adopted Anna Guérin's ‘Inter-Allied Poppy Day’ idea before her representative Colonel Moffat arrived so he did not need to persuade, only promote and help organise the Poppy Day campaign.  At the 6th annual congress of the ‘Returned Sailors and Soldiers Imperial League of Australia’ in Brisbane (5 August 1921), it was declared that the decision was suggested by Canada.  Australia's first Poppy Day was on 11 November 1921, Armistice Day.  Although Anna never visited Australia, she maintained communication with the Australian veterans, over the years.  Newspapers tracked Colonel Moffat's movements and recorded all facts about the country's Poppy Days. 

NEW ZEALAND was the most loyal of the World War One Allied nations to Madame Guérin. The country continued to purchase French-made poppies through until 1928, inclusive.  On 26 September 1921, the Dominion Executive of the Returned Soldiers' Association passed a resolution to adopt the red poppy and Anna Guérin's Poppy Day idea.  They ordered and paid for 350,000 of them for Armistice Day but the ship 'Westmorland' arrived too late and wanting to recover their costs, the RSA sold them on the next available commemoration date and that was Dardanelles Day 1922. Ironically New Zealand didn't serve in the Dardanelles. So ANZAC Day became, by accident, the day the Poppies have been sold in New Zealand ever since and why they are the odd one out. . As with Australia, Anna Guérin never visited New Zealand but she maintained communication with its veterans. Many New Zealand women remained “representatives” of Madame Guérin through those years and they gave talks at schools etc., promoting her idea.  New Zealand  newspapers tracked Col. Moffat's movements and recorded facts about the country's Poppy Days.

Later life 

After 1921, Guérin continued to visit the US, sailing across the Atlantic twice a year on average.  More often than not, it was via the Cherbourg – New York shipping route.  For a few years, she ran a shop selling French antiques in New York – sister Juliette and friend Blanche managed it, whenever she was not in the United States. In 1941, Guérin wrote a synopsis which documented all her fundraising in the US, from 1914 to 1921. Guérin spent the World War II years in the United States. Madame Guérin died on 16 April 1961, in Paris.

For the first time in France, the 11th of Novembre 2021, a ceremony was organized in Aubigny-sur-Nère by the Office national des anciens combattants et victimes de guerre (ONACVG) and the local authorities, where a place was dedicated to the French Lady Poppy.

References

External links 
 https://poppyladymadameguerin.wordpress.com/  Documented, sourced research on Madame Guérin.
 http://releves.free.fr/index.php?page=ec&ville=vallon Civil Registers, Ardeche (Fr)
 http://archives.ardeche.fr/ Ardeche Archives (Fr)
 http://vosdroits.service-public.fr/particuliers/N359.xhtml Mairies de Paris (Fr)
 http://gallica.bnf.fr/html/und/presse-et-revues/les-principaux-quotidiens Bibliothèque nationale de France (Ff)
 https://www.britishnewspaperarchive.co.uk/ British Library Historical Archives
 https://archive.legion.org/handle/20.500.12203/2957 American Legion Weekly: 15 Oct. 1920, page 11.
 https://archive.legion.org/handle/20.500.12203/2975 American Legion Weekly: 4 Feb. 1921, page 19.
 http://digital.denverlibrary.org/ Denver Public Library Archives
 http://hmfa.libs.uga.edu/hmfa/view?docId=ead/ms3137-ead.xml Hargrett Library, University of Georgia 
 https://www.georgiaarchives.org State of Georgia Archives: Moina Belle Michael Collection 
 https://www.loc.gov/resource/wpalh1.12081212/?sp=1 Library of Congress, Washington DC
 https://history.nebraska.gov/collections/hartley-burr-alexander-1873-1939-rg4028am Nebraska State Historical Society
 https://trove.nla.gov.au/newspaper/  National Library of Australia 
 https://www.awm.gov.au/collection/C1231634 Australian War Memorial
 https://www.dva.gov.au/ Department of Veterans’ Affairs, Australian Government
 https://www.rsa.org.nz/stories/history-rsa-poppy-appeal Returned & Services League of New Zealand
 https://paperspast.natlib.govt.nz/ National Library of New Zealand 
 http://www.aucklandcity.govt.nz/dbtw-wpd/CityArchives/searchkeyword.htm Auckland Council Archives NZ
 https://www.warmuseum.ca/cwm/exhibitions/remember/poppy_e.html Canadian War Museum
 http://www.tbpl.ca/ Brodie Resource Library, Thunder Bay, Ontario (Canada)
 http://www.legion.ca/ Royal Canadian Legion: ‘Service: The Story of the Canadian Legion 1925 – 1960’ by C.H. Bowering
 https://www.britishnewspaperarchive.co.uk/ British Library Historical Archives
 https://www.newspapers.com/  Historical Archives 
 https://cdnc.ucr.edu/cgi-bin/cdnc California Digital Newspaper Collection
 https://www.torontopubliclibrary.ca/detail?R=EDB0111   Toronto Star Historical Newspaper Archive
 http://www.greatwar.co.uk/article/remembrance-poppy.htm Great War: poppy history
 https://www.poppyfactory.org/announcement/anna-guerin-sells-silk-poppies/ Poppy Factory, Richmond, London, UK
 https://www.ladyhaigspoppyfactory.org.uk/  Lady Haig's Poppy Factory, Edinburgh, Scotland
 https://www.poppyscotland.org.uk/  poppyscotland 
 https://www.rsa.org.nz/ Royal New Zealand Returned and Services' Association
 http://rslnational.org/ Returned and Services League, Australia
 https://legion.ca/ Royal Canadian Legion

French women in World War I
1878 births
1961 deaths
People from Ardèche